Debbie Jarvis (born 16 January 1964) is a British sailor. She competed at the 1988 Summer Olympics and the 1992 Summer Olympics.

References

External links
 

1964 births
Living people
British female sailors (sport)
Olympic sailors of Great Britain
Sailors at the 1988 Summer Olympics – 470
Sailors at the 1992 Summer Olympics – 470
Sportspeople from Leicester